Doris Jordan (married name Doris Haydon) was a female English international table tennis player.

She won a silver medal in the women's team event and a bronze medal in the women's doubles with Phyllis Hodgkinson at the 1938 World Table Tennis Championships.

Personal life
She married international player Arthur Adrian Haydon in 1938 and they had a child called Adrianne Haydon in October 1938; Adrianne is better known as Ann Jones.

See also
 List of table tennis players
 List of World Table Tennis Championships medalists

References

English female table tennis players
Living people
World Table Tennis Championships medalists
Year of birth missing (living people)